Janajyoti Vidyamandir (Nepali: जनज्योति विध्यामन्दिर) is an English medium boarding school in Ghorahi, Dang, Nepal. The school was established in 1997 (2054 BS).

The school was founded by 16 members. It is now one of the top English boarding schools in Nepal. Notable teachers include Jeevan Kumar Acharya (Science), Yuvraj Yogi (Mathematics), Madan Raj Regmi (Nepali), Hikmat Thapa (Optional Maths), Khem Raj Acharya (Nepali), Pitambar Shah (English), Prakash Sharma (Civics) and Bimal Shrestha (Account, Math).

This school is one of the notable schools of Nepal. Despite many students, it has been able to give correct and qualitative education to all. Different facilities that are rarely seen in the other schools are found in this school. Drinking water is being continuously provided from its own boring. Science Lab and 
Computer Lab facilities are available. 

This school has remarkable results in S.L.C including district top and Mid-Western Development Region, Nepal top as well. J.J.V.M school has the highest number of students (2200 as of 2072 B.S) in the district. It has a science laboratory, a computer lab, clean drinking water, a library, a latrine, and a playground for table tennis and basketball.

See also
Boarding school
Education in Nepal
Ghorahi
List of schools in Nepal

References 

https://www.facebook.com/janajyotividyamandirghorahidang

Boarding schools in Nepal

Educational institutions established in 1997
1997 establishments in Nepal